Menominee , also spelled Menomini is an endangered Algonquian language spoken by the historic Menominee people of what is now northern Wisconsin in the United States. The federally recognized tribe has been working to encourage revival of use of the language by intensive classes locally and partnerships with universities. Most of the fluent speakers are elderly. Many of the people use English as their first language.

The tribe has gathered and cultivated this native food as a staple for millennia. The Ojibwa, their neighbors to the north who are one of the Anishinaabe peoples and also speak an Algonquian language, also use this term for them.

The main characteristics of Menominee, as compared to other Algonquian languages, are its extensive use of the low front vowel , its rich negation morphology, and its lexicon. Some scholars (notably Bloomfield and Sapir) have classified it as a Central Algonquian language based on its phonology.

For good sources of information on both the Menominee and their language include Leonard Bloomfield's 1928 bilingual text collection, his 1962 grammar (a landmark in its own right), and Skinner's earlier anthropological work.

Usage and revitalization efforts 
Menominee is a highly endangered language, as there are only a handful of fluent speakers left. According to a 1997 report by the Menominee Historic Preservation Office, 39 people spoke Menominee as their first language, all of whom were elderly; 26 spoke it as their second language; and 65 others had learned some of it for the purpose of understanding the language and/or teaching it to others.

The Menominee Language & Culture Commission was established by the Menominee Nation to promote the continued use of the language. In the 21st century, residents of the Menominee reservation at Keshena have held intensive classes for learners of all ages, and have worked with linguists from the University of Wisconsin–Madison to document the language and to develop curriculum and learning materials.

In 1977, Menominee High School, founded when "the Indians of the Menominee Reservation separated from the Shawano-Gresham School District to open their own district," began to offer Menominee language, drumming, and tribal dance in addition to its academic program.

Classes in the Menominee language are available locally at the pre-school, high-school, and adult levels, and at the College of Menominee Nation and University of Wisconsin–Green Bay.

In 2012, the Catholic Diocese of Green Bay issued an apology to "a seventh-grader who was punished after using her native Menominee language in the classroom" in Shawano, Wisconsin.

As of 2013, there are "six or seven people ... able to be conversational in the language," according to an article on the Menominee Place Names Map, a collaborative project at the University of Wisconsin–Stevens Point.

Orthography and phonology
Below are the basic orthography and phonemes (represented in IPA) of Menominee.

Vowels
The same is true for 
Short   is particularly open when found before h and q.
 is consistently lengthened before .
Final  after  becomes primarily bilabial.

Consonants

 is postdental.
 and  do not appear initially, except sometimes as the on-glide of a vowel, in which case they should probably not be considered phonemic.

Consonants, including nasals, are palatalized before front vowels and labialized before back vowels.

Menominee does not make contrasts between voiced and voiceless stops and voicing from a following vowel may set in before the opening is complete.

Syllable structure and stress

Syllable structure in Menominee is typically VC(C) or C(C)VC(C); syllables do not end in vowels.  Any consonant can begin or end a syllable except h and q.  The only clusters which can occur at the end of a syllable are qc and qs.  The only cluster which can begin a syllable is kw.

Primary stress occurs on every long vowel or diphthong that is in the next-to-last syllable of a word.  Most compounds and inflected forms are treated as single words in assigning stress.  Rhetorical stress comes on the last syllable.

Pitch

In an interrogative sentence which uses a question word, there is a rising and then falling of pitch near the beginning and a drop at the end.  In yes–no questions, there is a sharp rise in pitch at the end of the sentence.  The modulations of pitch for expressing exclamations, quotations, etc. is generally much more pronounced in Menominee than in English.

Grammar – general

Lexical categories
Bloomfield states there are five overarching categories in Menominee: noun, pronoun, negator, verb, and particle. Nouns, pronouns, negators, and verbs all take inflection whereas particles do not carry any morphology.

Agreement 
Agreement morphology in Menominee can be fusional, e.g. animacy and number (nouns), are indicated within the same affix.

Animacy
All nouns are split into two categories and are inflected for animacy and are classified as either animate or inanimate. Animacy in Menominee is a grammatical construct for noun classification and not a reflection of the noun's status as "living" or "non-living." Therefore, some semantically inherently inanimate objects are grammatically animate.

Number 
All nouns are required to be inflected if they are plural. Nouns which are singular are unmarked.

Person marking 
Menominee has four grammatical persons: first, second, third, and indefinite.

Grammar – nouns

Agreement morphology 
Noun classes are split based on grammatical gender into two categories: animate and inanimate. Additionally, all nouns must be marked for plurality. Plurality agreement are suffixes that attach to noun stems. Singular forms are unmarked (represented by zero morpheme "ø") and plural has two forms, as shown in the table below.

{| class="wikitable"
! colspan="2" |Inanimate
! rowspan="3" |
! colspan="2" |Animate
|-
|Singular
|Plural
|Singular
|Plural
|-
|  -ø
|  -an
|  -ø
|  -ak
|}

These suffixes are attached directly to noun stems or to possessed themes. Examples below show singular and plural inflections of both animate and inanimate nouns:

There are four personal prefixes used to modify nouns and in personal pronouns:

1st person: 
2nd person:  (also used for inclusive 1st person plural)
3rd person: 
indefinite: 

These affixes are used to indicate possession (e.g. They are also used in the inflection of verbs to indicate the actor.

The personal pronouns formed by these prefixes are as follows:

Nouns and nearly all pronouns are inflected for singular and plural.  Some nouns occur only as singulars, typically denoting liquids or other uncountable substances (e.g. , 'coffee').  The singular is often used for a representative meaning, e.g. , 'the way the Menomini lives'.

Nouns can also be inflected for locality:

 , 'house'
 , 'in a house'
 , 'this'
 , 'right here'

Diminutives can be formed from any noun by suffixing .

Agent nouns (i.e., nouns that mean one who does the action of the verb, such as worker from work, talker from talk, in English) are homonymous with the third person inflected verb.  So,

 , 'he works' or 'worker'
 , 'he whittles' or 'carpenter'

Grammar – verbs 

Menominee displays inflectional reference.  Nouns, verbs, and objects are inflected to agree in gender, person, and number of their possessor, actor, or transitive verb, respectively.

Intransitive verbs typically occur in two forms: one for animate actors, the other for inanimate actors:

 , 'he falls'
 , 'it falls'

Transitive verbs can be used with either animate or inanimate actors.  Transitive verbs contain inflectional reference both to their subject and to the object.  One form of the verb exists for animate objects and another for inanimate objects:

 , 'he fears him'
 , 'he fears it'

Impersonal verbs occur with no identifiable actor and in the singular inflection:

 , 'it is cold'
 , 'it is raining'

The negator  typically precedes the verb: , 'it is not raining'.  The negator also inflects for certain elements of modal inflection: , 'why, it isn't raining anymore!'  It can be used alone to answer a yes–no question.  The particle  is used to negate imperatives: , 'don't be too late'.

Bloomfield distinguishes five modes of the verb in Menominee, which are reflected in the verb, negator, personal and demonstrative pronouns, and auxiliary verbs:

Indicative: , 'he comes'
The indicative makes statements.  In the first-person plural, it is used as a hortatory (first person plural imperative: , 'let's set out'

Quotative: , 'it is said that he comes'
It is the mode used in traditional narrative.
Interrogative: , 'is he coming?'
The interrogative is used for yes–no questions.
Present: , 'so he is coming'
Preterit: , 'he did formerly come'

Language family
Menominee is one of the Algonquian languages, which are part of the larger family of Algic languages. Goddard (1996) and Mithun (1999) classify it with the Central and Plains Algonquian languages along with languages like Blackfoot, Arapaho, Cheyenne, the Cree languages, and Eastern Great Lakes languages like Ojibwe.

Notes

External links
Wisconsin Tribal Languages in Danger of Dying Out
Menominee Indian Tribe of Wisconsin Language & Culture Commission
Native Languages of the Americas: Menominee
Menominee Language Lessons
The Meaning of the Menominee Myth of the Flood--in Relation to People Today

OLAC resources in and about the Menominee language
Menominee Language Institute: Language Materials - Dictionaries & Word Lists

Central Algonquian languages
Indigenous languages of the North American eastern woodlands
Great Lakes tribal culture
Languages of the United States
Native American language revitalization
Native American history of Wisconsin
Endangered Algic languages